London Capital may refer to:

London Capital Club, a private members' club, at the former Gresham clubhouse
London Capital Credit Union, a savings and loans co-operative, based in Archway
PAWS London Capital, a former basketball team, active 1998–2013

See also
Capital London, an independent local radio station, owned by Global Radio
London, the capital city of England and the United Kingdom